Valter Birsa (born 7 August 1986) is a retired Slovenian footballer who played as a winger.

Club career
Born in Šempeter pri Gorici, he spent his childhood in Nova Gorica, Slovenia. Birsa's career began at the age of five, when he started playing for ND Bilje, the village club of Bilje near Nova Gorica. As he was a talented player, he was soon transferred first to Primorje, and then to Gorica at the age of 17.

Sochaux
In 2006, he signed for French club Sochaux in Ligue de Football Professionnel. While at Sochaux, he won the 2007 Coupe de France. The final game against Olympique de Marseille finished 2–2 and went to penalties, with Birsa scoring his penalty as his side emerged victorious.

Auxerre (loan)
On 22 January 2009, Auxerre signed him on a loan deal until June 2009 from Sochaux. He scored his first Auxerre goal against Olympique Lyonnais. On 29 May 2009, it was announced that Auxerre had made the loan permanent. In the 2010–11 season, Birsa scored a 23-yard free kick and his first UEFA Champions League goal against Ajax in the group stage. Ajax eventually won 2–1.

Genoa
On 2 February 2011, despite interest from big Premier league teams such as Liverpool and Fulham, Birsa signed a four-year contract with Serie A club Genoa. He made just nine appearances in his maiden season in Italy.

Torino (loan)
He joined Torino on 31 August 2012 on loan. At Torino, Birsa played 17 games, scoring 2 goals but did not do enough to convince Torino to sign him on a permanent deal so he returned to Genoa at the end of the season.

AC Milan
Birsa made the switch to AC Milan on 31 August 2013, in what was a straight swap deal which saw Luca Antonini move in the opposite direction. He was handed the number 14 shirt at Milan. He scored his first goal for the club on 28 September 2013 against Sampdoria to give the Rossoneri the win.

Chievo
He signed for Chievo on 9 July 2014 on loan. On 2 July 2015, Chievo signed Birsa outright in a three-year contract.

Cagliari
On 9 January 2019, Birsa signed with Serie A side Cagliari.

International career
Birsa played for the Slovenian national team between 2006 and 2018. He scored his first goal for the national team on 9 September 2009 in a World Cup qualifying match against Poland, which Slovenia won 3–0. At the 2010 FIFA World Cup, Birsa struck a long-range curling shot in Slovenia's second group stage match against the United States. Slovenia drew that match 2–2.

Personal life
Birsa was born in Šempeter pri Gorici, present day Slovenia. In 2012, he married his long-time girlfriend Mateja. He has a son named Nolan.

Career statistics

Club

International 
Scores and results list Slovenia's goal tally first, score column indicates score after each Birsa goal.

Honours
Gorica
 Slovenian PrvaLiga: 2004–05, 2005–06

Sochaux
 Coupe de France: 2006–07

Individual
 Slovenian Footballer of the Year: 2010

See also
Slovenian international players

References

External links

Player profile at NZS 
Player profile at LFP

1986 births
Living people
People from Šempeter pri Gorici
Slovenian footballers
Association football wingers
Association football midfielders
NK Primorje players
ND Gorica players
FC Sochaux-Montbéliard players
AJ Auxerre players
Genoa C.F.C. players
Torino F.C. players
A.C. Milan players
A.C. ChievoVerona players
Cagliari Calcio players
Slovenian expatriate footballers
Expatriate footballers in France
Slovenian expatriate sportspeople in France
Expatriate footballers in Italy
Slovenian expatriate sportspeople in Italy
Slovenian PrvaLiga players
Ligue 1 players
Serie A players
Slovenia youth international footballers
Slovenia under-21 international footballers
Slovenia international footballers
2010 FIFA World Cup players